Lawrence County is a county in the northern part of the U.S. state of Alabama. As of the 2020 census, the population was 33,073. The county seat is Moulton. The county was named after James Lawrence, a captain in the United States Navy from New Jersey.

Lawrence County is included in the Decatur, AL Metropolitan Statistical Area, which is also included in the Huntsville-Decatur-Albertville, AL Combined Statistical Area.

History

For thousands of years, this area was inhabited by differing cultures of indigenous peoples. People of the Copena culture in the Middle Woodland period (1–500 CE) built complex earthworks as part of their religious and political system.  Their burial mound and ceremonial platform mound, the largest in the state, are preserved at Oakville Indian Mounds Park and Museum. The museum includes exhibits on the Cherokee, an Iroquoian-speaking people who inhabited the area at the time of European encounter.  Other historic Native American tribes in this state were Choctaw and Creek, who both spoke Muskogean languages.

Lawrence County was established by the legislature of the Alabama Territory on February 6, 1818. Under the Indian Removal Act of 1830, the U.S. government forced most of the members of these Southeast tribes to go west of the Mississippi River to Indian Territory to the west. They wanted to extinguish their land claims to open the area to settlement by Americans.

Numerous Cherokee and mixed-race European-Cherokee descendants, sometimes called "Black Dutch", have stayed in the Lawrence County area. According to the census, the county has the highest number of self-identified Native Americans in the state. The state-recognized Echota Cherokee Tribe of Alabama has their Blue Clan in this county with 4,000 enrolled members.

Geography

River
Tennessee River
Sipsey Fork of the Black Warrior River

Adjacent counties
Limestone County (northeast)
Morgan County (east)
Cullman County (southeast)
Winston County (south)
Franklin County (west)
Colbert County (west)
Lauderdale County (northwest)

National protected area
 William B. Bankhead National Forest (part)

Transportation

Major highways

 U.S. Highway 72 Alternate
 Alabama 20
 Alabama 24
 Alabama 33
 Alabama 36
 Alabama 101
 Alabama 157
 Alabama 184

Rail
Norfolk Southern Railway

Demographics

2000 census
At the 2000 census there were 34,803 people, 13,538 households, and 10,194 families living in the county.  The population density was 50 people per square mile (19/km2).  There were 15,009 housing units at an average density of 22 per square mile (8/km2).  The racial makeup of the county was 77.77% White, 13.36% Black or African American, 5.36% Native American, 0.10% Asian, 0.01% Pacific Islander, 0.33% from other races, and 3.08% from two or more races.  1.05% of the population were Hispanic or Latino of any race.
In 2000, the largest ancestry groups in Lawrence County were English 61.2%, African 13.36%, Irish 4.1% and Welsh 2.0%.

Of the 13,538 households 34.70% had children under the age of 18 living with them, 60.50% were married couples living together, 11.20% had a female householder with no husband present, and 24.70% were non-families. 22.60% of households were one person and 9.50% were one person aged 65 or older.  The average household size was 2.55 and the average family size was 2.99.

The age distribution was 25.70% under the age of 18, 8.40% from 18 to 24, 30.10% from 25 to 44, 23.70% from 45 to 64, and 12.10% 65 or older.  The median age was 36 years. For every 100 females, there were 96.20 males.  For every 100 females age 18 and over, there were 92.40 males.

The median household income was $31,549 and the median family income  was $38,565. Males had a median income of $31,519 versus $20,480 for females. The per capita income for the county was $16,515.  About 13.10% of families and 15.30% of the population were below the poverty line, including 16.80% of those under age 18 and 24.50% of those age 65 or over.

2010 census
At the 2010 census there were 34,339 people, 13,654 households, and 9,985 families living in the county. The population density was 50 people per square mile (19/km2). There were 15,229 housing units at an average density of 22 per square mile (8/km2). The racial makeup of the county was 77.6% White, 11.5% Black or African American, 5.7% Native American, 0.1% Asian, 0.0% Pacific Islander, 0.8% from other races, and 4.3% from two or more races. 1.7% of the population were Hispanic or Latino of any race.
Of the 13,654 households 29.4% had children under the age of 18 living with them, 55.7% were married couples living together, 12.6% had a female householder with no husband present, and 26.9% were non-families. 24.2% of households were one person and 10.2% were one person aged 65 or older.  The average household size was 2.50 and the average family size was 2.95.

The age distribution was 23.2% under the age of 18, 8.4% from 18 to 24, 24.8% from 25 to 44, 29.1% from 45 to 64, and 14.6% 65 or older.  The median age was 40.6 years. For every 100 females, there were 95.7 males. For every 100 females age 18 and over, there were 97.4 males.

The median household income was $40,516 and the median family income  was $48,425. Males had a median income of $45,787 versus $27,341 for females. The per capita income for the county was $19,370. About 10.3% of families and 13.6% of the population were below the poverty line, including 17.3% of those under age 18 and 11.0% of those age 65 or over.

2020 census

As of the 2020 United States census, there were 33,073 people, 12,677 households, and 9,101 families residing in the county.

Education
Lawrence County is home to three high schools: East Lawrence High School (3A), Hatton High School (2A), and Lawrence County High School (5A). Lawrence County also has six elementary schools and two middle schools.  Other educational facilities include the Lawrence County Center of Technology and the Judy Jester Learning Center.

Former high schools, Hazlewood High School, Speake High School, and Mt. Hope High School were closed in 2009, R.A. Hubbard High School was closed in 2022

Government
Lawrence County is reliably Republican at the presidential level. The last Democrat to win the county in a presidential election is Al Gore in 2000.

Communities

Cities
Moulton (county seat)

Towns
Courtland
Hillsboro
North Courtland
Town Creek

Census Designated Places
Hatton

Unincorporated communities

Caddo
Chalybeate Springs
Landersville
Loosier
Mount Hope
Muck City
Oakville
Pittsburg
Speake
Wheeler
Wolf Springs
Wren
Youngtown

Places of interest
Lawrence County is home to part of the William B. Bankhead National Forest, Oakville Indian Mounds, Jesse Owens Memorial Park, and Pond Spring, the General Joe Wheeler Home. The Black Warrior Path, which starts in Cullman County, runs through this county and passes the Oakville Indian Mounds. It was used by Native Americans for hundreds of years, and was later used by pioneer settlers.

Events
Every year, Lawrence County hosts numerous events, including the AHSAA Cross Country state championships at the Oakville Indian Mounds, the Alabama Multicultural Indian Festival at the Oakville Indian Mounds, the Strawberry Festival in Moulton, and General Joe Wheeler's Birthday Party at Pond Spring in Courtland. The cities of Moulton and Courtland each celebrate Christmas on the Square during the month of December.

See also
National Register of Historic Places listings in Lawrence County, Alabama
Properties on the Alabama Register of Landmarks and Heritage in Lawrence County, Alabama
 Water contamination in Lawrence and Morgan Counties, Alabama

References

External links
Lawrence County Chamber of Commerce
East Lawrence High School 
Lawrence County School System
Lawrence County Sheriff's Office
 

 
Decatur metropolitan area, Alabama
Huntsville-Decatur, AL Combined Statistical Area
1818 establishments in Alabama Territory
Populated places established in 1818
Counties of Appalachia